Regard the End is the sixth full album by alt-country band Willard Grant Conspiracy.

The song "Soft Hand" is used in the 2003 film Stuck on You.

Track listing
All music written by Robert Fisher.

 "River in the Pines" – 4:45
 "The Trials of Harrison Hayes" – 3:16
 "Beyond the Shore" – 3:13
 "The Ghost of the Girl in the Well" – 4:50
 "Twistification" – 5:23
 "Another Man Is Gone" – 3:22
 "Soft Hand" – 5:43
 "Rosalee" – 3:31
 "Fare Thee Well" – 4:09
 "Day Is Passed and Gone" – 1:46
 "The Suffering Song" – 7:51

Personnel
Eighteen musicians collaborated on the record including:

Robert Fisher
Simon Alpin
Chris Eckman (The Walkabouts)
Kristin Hersh
Blake Hazard
Jess Klein
Pete Sutton
Nathan Logus
David Michael Curry
Dennis Cronin

References

2003 albums
Willard Grant Conspiracy albums
Glitterhouse Records albums
Loose Music albums
Albums recorded in Slovenia